Willie Esterhuizen is an Afrikaans actor, writer and director. He is known for his roles in the popular TV series Vetkoekpaleis and Gauteng-aleng-aleng.

Esterhuizen received dance training at the University of Cape Town, after which he studied drama for two years at the Arts Educational School in London. Two years later he became a member of KRUIK and moved to Johannesburg to do television work.

Filmography 
As director:
 Vir Beter of Baie Beter (TV-series), 2014
 Molly en Wors (TV-series)
 Stoute Boudjies, 2010
 Vaatjie sien sy gat, 2008
 Poena is Koning, 2007
 Begeertes (TV-series), 2006
 Lipstiek Dipstiek, 1994
 Orkney Snork Nie 2, 1993
 Orkney Snork Nie (Die Moevie), 1992
 Orkney Snork Nie (TV-series), 1989-1992

As writer:
 Vir Beter of Baie Beter, 2014
 Stoute Boudjies, 2010
 Vaatjie sien sy gat, 2008
 Begeertes (TV-series), 2006
 Vetkoekpaleis, 1996-2000
 Gauteng Aleng(TV-Series), 2003 - 2004
 Lipstiek Dipstiek, 1994
 Orkney Snork Nie (TV-series), 1989-1992

As actor:
 Faan se Trein, 2014
 Stoute Boudjies, 2010
 Vaatjie sien sy gat, 2008
 Liewe Hemel, Genis!, 1987 as Visser Botes (Vissertjie)
 Vetkoekpaleis, 1996-2000
 Wie Laaste Lag, 1985 as Lafras
 Koöperasiestories (TV-series) as Vissertjie, 1983
 Wat Jy Saai, 1979 as Christiaan MacDonald

Awards 
 Golden Loerie Award for TV advertising (2002)
 Avanti Award for Best Actor (1999)
 Avanti Award for Best Comedy Production (1999)
 Avanti Award for Best Writer (1999)
 Star Tonight award: Best Writer (1994)

External links 
 
 

South African male film actors
Year of birth missing (living people)
Living people